Marcus Eli Ravage (Revici) (June 25, 1884, Bârlad, Romania – October 6, 1965 Grasse, France) was a Jewish American immigrant writer who wrote many books and articles about immigration in America and Europe between the world wars. Best known for his autobiographical book An American in the Making (1917), he is also known for his 1928 satirical article, "A Real Case Against the Jews.”

He was also a biographer of the Rothschild family, as well as of Napoleon's second wife Marie Louise. In addition to his longer works, he served as European correspondent for The Nation, and wrote for both Harper’s Magazine and The New Republic.

His articles "A real case against the Jews" and "Commissary to the Gentiles", published in the January and February 1928 issues of Century Magazine were apparently translated as "a devastating admission" first in the Czernowitz Allgemeine Zeitung on September 2, 1933. It was then re-translated as A voice in the wilderness; Jewish rabbi [sic] on Hitler's anti-Semitism by Right Cause in Chicago.

He attended the University of Missouri in Columbia, Missouri after moving to the United States.

Works

Anthologies

See also 
 Maurice Samuel – author of You Gentiles
 Samuel Roth – author of Jews Must live
 A Racial Program for the Twentieth Century
 Theodore N. Kaufman – author of Germany Must Perish!

References

Sources
 Christopher Clausen, "Grandfathers," in My Life with President Kennedy (University of Iowa Press, 1994).

External links
 

1884 births
1965 deaths
American magazine writers
American people of Romanian-Jewish descent
People from Bârlad
Romanian emigrants to the United States
Romanian Jews
University of Missouri alumni